William Clegg may refer to:
 William Clegg (footballer) (1852–1932), English footballer and politician
 William Clegg (cricketer) (1869–1949), English cricketer
 William Henry Clegg (1867–1945), governor of the South African Reserve Bank

See also
 Bill Clegg, American literary agent and author